Ghallehzar (also Romanized as Ghallehzār) is a village in Qazi Jahan Rural District, Howmeh District, Azarshahr County, East Azerbaijan Province, Iran. At the 2006 census, its population was 198, in 47 families.

References 

Populated places in Azarshahr County